Amir Kalayeh (also Romanized as Amīr Kalāyeh; also known as Amīr Kolā) is a village in Layl Rural District, in the Central District of Lahijan County, Gilan Province, Iran. At the 2006 census, its population was 64, in 16 families.

References 

Populated places in Lahijan County